Presidential and parliamentary elections were held in the Autonomous Region of Bougainville in Papua New Guinea from 6 to 21 May 2010.

Presidential election

The incumbent, James Tanis, lost to the long-time politician John Momis who gained 52% of the vote, or around 50,000 votes to Tanis' 15,000. Momis was sworn in on 15 June 2010.

References

External links
New Dawn: List of final results of the House of Representatives from 2010 election

Elections in the Autonomous Region of Bougainville
2010 elections in Oceania
2010 in Papua New Guinea
Elections in Papua New Guinea